Todd Richards is a snowboarder from Paxton, Massachusetts. Richards helped introduce "skate style" at a time when the sport was mainly influenced by alpine racing events. Richards grew up skateboarding on the East Coast and translated his skills on four wheels to riding a halfpipe made of snow.

During his career, Richards won multiple US Open halfpipe titles, X Games gold medals, and World Championship firsts. He was a member of the 1998 US Olympic Halfpipe Team in Nagano. In 2003, Richards published an autobiography titled P3: Parks, Pipes, and Powder. He has done color commentary for NBC's coverage of the Torino, Vancouver, Sochi, Pyeongchang, and Beijing Olympic Games and has produced a series of webisodes entitled "Todcasts for Quiksilver."

Richards is the subject of a documentary entitled "Me, Myself and I" that was released in 2009.

Actor
He played a former professional snowboarder in the 2001 movie Out Cold.

References

External links
Athlete Bios: Snowboard Halfpipe

American male snowboarders
Living people
Olympic snowboarders of the United States
People from Paxton, Massachusetts
Snowboarders at the 1998 Winter Olympics
Sportspeople from Worcester County, Massachusetts
Year of birth missing (living people)